Nupserha insignis is a species of beetle in the family Cerambycidae. It was described by Per Olof Christopher Aurivillius in 1911.

References

insignis
Beetles described in 1911